Prevention may refer to:

Health and medicine 
 Preventive healthcare, measures to prevent diseases or injuries rather than curing them or treating their symptoms

General safety 
 Crime prevention, the attempt to reduce deter crime and criminals
 Disaster prevention, measures taken to prevent and provide protection for disasters
 Pollution prevention in the US, activities that reduce the amount of pollution generated by a process
 Preventive maintenance, maintenance performed to prevent faults from occurring or developing into major defects
 Prevent strategy, a scheme in the UK to report radicalisation
 Risk prevention, reducing the potential of loss from a given action, activity and/or inaction
 Risk management, the identification, assessment, and prioritization of risks in business

Other uses 
 Prevention (magazine), an American healthy lifestyle magazine
 Prevention (album), a 2009 album by the Scottish indie rock band De Rosa
 Prevent defense, an American football defensive alignment
 Prevention First, a nonprofit organization supporting drug-free communities through public education

See also
 Preventive Medicine (journal), a peer-reviewed medical journal
 Prevention paradox, the situation where the majority of cases of a disease come from a population at low risk
 Prevention science, the application of a scientific methodology to prevent or moderate major human dysfunctions
 Prevention through design, the concept of mitigating occupational hazards by "designing them out"
 Preventable (book), a 2022 book by Devi Sridhar